Frontier Developments plc. is a British video game developer founded by David Braben in January 1994 and based at the Cambridge Science Park in Cambridge, England. Frontier is known for developing amusement park management simulators within multiple franchises owned by other companies which led to the development of the in-house titles Planet Coaster and Planet Zoo, and has produced several games in David Braben's Elite series, including Elite Dangerous. The company takes its name from the earliest titles in the Elite series with which it was involved, a port of Frontier: Elite II and development of Frontier: First Encounters. In 2013, the company reincorporated as a public limited company and was listed on the AIM segment of the London Stock Exchange.

History 
Frontier Developments' first game was the 1993 Amiga CD32 port of the largely successful Frontier: Elite II followed by Frontier: First Encounters, second sequel to the seminal 1984 game Elite by Acornsoft. The company describes the original Elite as a "Game by Frontier", in its back catalogue during the company's 2013 sale of shares to the public, with David Braben owning all rights to the game assigned to the company in 2008.

Between 2005 and 2011, Frontier developed The Outsider, an action-adventure game set in Washington DC that Braben said would advance video game storytelling. The Outsider was cancelled in January 2011 after it was dropped by the publisher, Codemasters, leading to nearly 30 staff layoffs.

Frontier had been planning a new Elite sequel, under the working title Elite 4, since 1998. The company completed a successful Kickstarter campaign at the end of 2012, where the new sequel's name Elite: Dangerous was revealed. Early-access versions of the game have been playable by backers since December 2013. The full game was released to PC on 16 December 2014.

Frontier Developments has made many other games, including Dog's Life, Thrillville, and RollerCoaster Tycoon 3. The company also made games for the Wallace and Gromit franchise, and has released Wallace & Gromit in Project Zoo, and a tie-in game for Wallace & Gromit: The Curse of the Were-Rabbit. In 2008, Frontier released LostWinds, a launch title for Nintendo's WiiWare platform. It received critical acclaim, scoring 81% on Metacritic. It was followed up with a sequel in 2009, entitled LostWinds: Winter of the Melodias, which scored 86% on Metacritic. In 2010, Frontier developed Kinectimals for Microsoft's Kinect controller on the Xbox 360. In 2011 Kinect Disneyland Adventures and Kinectimals: Now With Bears were developed, along with ports of LostWinds for iOS and Kinectimals for iOS and Windows Phone. In 2012, Frontier released Coaster Crazy, and started to work on Elite: Dangerous Kickstarter, which successfully closed at the start of 2013. In 2013, Frontier released Xbox One and Xbox 360 exclusive Zoo Tycoon, published by Microsoft Studios, and launched backers alpha for Elite: Dangerous in December. In 2015 the company released Screamride, a theme park construction and management simulation game for the Xbox 360 and Xbox One. The company has recently released Planet Coaster, a construction and management simulation video game similar to the RollerCoaster Tycoon franchise. The game is the second major self-published franchises from Frontier along with the Elite series. Frontier announced that they will begin self-publishing all their future games, starting with Planet Coaster.

Frontier opened a North American studio in August 2012 in Halifax, Nova Scotia, Canada under the name Frontier Developments Inc. and headed by David Walsh. It closed in January 2015.

On 3 January 2017 TMZ reported that the company sued Atari for not paying the company enough for royalties for their game RollerCoaster Tycoon 3; Frontier reported that they only received $1.17 million when they needed $3.37 million. David Walsh confirmed the report in a GameSpot interview, stating that they had previously attempted to resolve the issue without legal action since April 2016.

On 6 February 2017 Frontier announced that they had acquired licensing rights from Universal Pictures to be used in their third self-published title, an "enduring movie franchise of global renown". This was later announced to be Jurassic World Evolution, which released on 12 June 2018.

On 26 July 2017 the company announced Frontier Expo 2017, a press and community event focusing on Elite: Dangerous, Planet Coaster, and Jurassic World Evolution. The event took place on 7 October 2017 at the Queen Elizabeth Olympic Park, London, UK.

In July 2017, Tencent, a Chinese investment company, bought a 9% share in the company.

In March 10, 2020, Frontier announced that they had signed an agreement with Formula One to develop and release several management simulation games based on the F1 license. In this agreement, Frontier will release four games, starting from F1 Manager 2022 in 2022.

On 10 June 2021, Frontier announced Jurassic World Evolution 2 a sequel to their 2018 park builder game would be releasing in late 2021.

On 10 Mar 2022, Frontier announced they were cancelling all development of their latest version of Elite Dangerous, Odyssey, on consoles.

On 10 August 2022, Frontier announced David Braben was to step down from the position of CEO and take on a newly established executive role of President and Founder. Jonny Watts who has been with the company for 24 years, the last decade of which in the position of Chief Creative Officer was to become the new CEO. The changes were effective immediately. It was also announced that David Gammon would be retiring from his role as Chairman in December 2022 and David Wilton would take on this role at that time.

On 2 November 2022, Frontier announced that they had completed an acquisition of Complex Games following on from the success of Warhammer 40,000: Chaos Gate - Daemonhunters which was published under the Frontier Foundry label six months prior.

Publishing
In June 2019, Frontier announced that it would begin publishing games from third-party developers under a new label named Frontier Publishing. At Gamescom 2020, Frontier announced that their publishing label would be renamed to "Frontier Foundry", and that it would publish Struggling from Chasing Rats in 2020, and Lemnis Gate from  Ratloop Games in 2021. They would also publish an upcoming project from Haemimont Games. This game was revealed to be named Stranded: Alien Dawn which initially released as an Early Access title on Steam in October 2022, with a full release anticipated during 2023.

On 13 June 2021, Frontier announced Lemnis Gate would be released on 3 August 2021 with an open beta being scheduled for July 2021.

On 3 June 2021 during the Games Workshop Warhammer Skulls event, Frontier announced they would be publishing a reboot to the 1998 turn based game Warhammer 40,000: Chaos Gate named Warhammer 40,000: Chaos Gate - Daemonhunters. The reboot is to be developed by Canadian developer Complex Games and published under the Frontier Foundry label. It is set to release in 2022.

Additionally Frontier announced a sequel to FAR: Lone Sails named FAR: Changing Tides, developed by Okomotive and published under the Frontier Foundry label. The game was released in March 2022.

Deliver Us Mars, set ten years after the events of Deliver Us The Moon, was announced as part of the Future Games Show Spring Showcase on March 24, 2022. It features a new protagonist who reactivates her companion robot after an apparent ship crash on the planet of Mars. Deliver Us Mars is set to launch on both Epic Games Store and Steam PC storefronts, as well as Xbox Series X|S, Xbox One, PS5, and PS4 consoles.

The Great War: Western Front, a Real Time Strategy game developed by Petroglyph Games was announced as part of the Future Games Show during Gamescom on August 24, 2022. It is set to launch on the Epic Games Store and Steam PC storefronts in 2023.

Games

Games developed

Games published under the Frontier Foundry label

References

External links 
 

1994 establishments in England
British companies established in 1994
Companies based in Cambridge
Video game companies established in 1994
English brands
Video game companies of the United Kingdom
Video game development companies
Video game publishers
Companies listed on the Alternative Investment Market
Tencent